St. Mary's Road may refer to:

Canada

St. Mary's Road, the colloquial name of an old route in southeastern Manitoba, made up the following modern roads:
Winnipeg Route 52
Manitoba Provincial Road 200, from Winnipeg to Ste. Agathe
Manitoba Provincial Road 246, from Ste. Agathe to St. Jean Baptiste

Odonyms referring to religion